Henry Beckman (26 November 1921 – 17 June 2008) was a Canadian stage, film and television actor.

Career
Beckman appeared in well over 100 productions in the United States and Canada, including recurring roles as Commander Paul Richards in the 1954 Flash Gordon space opera television series, Bob Mulligan in the ABC sitcom I'm Dickens, He's Fenster, George Anderson in the television adaptation of Peyton Place, Captain Clancey in the Western comedy-drama Here Come the Brides, Harry Mark on Bronk, conniving United States Army Colonel Douglas Harrigan in McHale's Navy, Colonel Platt in the 1965 movie McHale's Navy Joins the Air Force, and as a sheriff in an episode of Rango.

He made four guest appearances on the CBS courtroom drama series Perry Mason, including the role of David the murderer in the 1960 episode "The Case of the Flighty Father", as Sydney L. Garth in the 1962 episode "The Case of the Captain's Coins", as Albert King in the 1965 episode "The Case of the Wrongful Writ" and as William March in the 1966 episode "The Case of the Dead Ringer".  He made a guest appearance as Cody on Honey West "A Matter of Wife and Death" (episode 4) in 1965.

In the 1980s he appeared in Kane & Abel, played the security guard Alf on the Don Adams sitcom Check It Out!, and was also a non-celebrity contestant on the TV game show Scrabble. He continued to act through his late seventies on shows like The Commish and MacGyver, and he had a recurring role in The X-Files for several seasons.

Awards/legacy
Beckman won two Canadian Film Awards for Best Supporting Actor, in 1975 for Why Rock the Boat? and in 1978 for Blood and Guts. With his first wife, actress Cheryl Maxwell, Beckman founded the Dukes Oak Theater in Cooperstown, New York, and served as the theater company's producer.

War service
He served with the Canadian Army during World War II, including the D-Day Landings at Juno Beach, Normandy, on 6 June 1944.

Writing
Beckman was the author of How to Sell your Film Project, a how-to guide on getting independent films produced, and Hollywood With its Pants Down, a witty look at some of actors he worked with over the years.

Family
He is the father of astrophysicist and software engineer Brian Beckman.

Death
Beckman died in Barcelona, Spain on 17 June 2008 with his second wife Hillary at his side.

Selected filmography

Niagara (1953) – Motorcycle Cop (uncredited)
The Glory Brigade (1953) – Soldier (uncredited)
The Wrong Man (1956) – Prisoner at Arraignment Hearing (uncredited)
So Lovely... So Deadly (1957) – Steve Clark
Police Station (1959) –  Detective Stan Abramson (TV series)
The Bramble Bush (1960) – Bill Watts (uncredited)
Breakfast at Tiffany's (1961) – Narcotics Detective Cronberger (uncredited)
13 West Street (1962) – Joe Bradford
The Man from the Diners' Club (1963) – Policeman (uncredited)
Twilight of Honor (1963) – Man Stirring Up Crowd (uncredited)
Dead Ringer (1964) – Prosecutor (uncredited)
Marnie (1964) – First Detective
A House Is Not a Home (1964) – Croupier (uncredited)
Kiss Me, Stupid (1964) – Truck Driver
The Satan Bug (1965) – Dr. Baxter
The Glory Guys (1965) – Salesman
McHale's Navy Joins the Air Force (1965) – Col. Platt
The Caper of the Golden Bulls (1967) – Bendell
Madigan (1968) – Philip Downes
The Stalking Moon (1968) – Sgt. Rudabaugh
Sweet Charity (1969) – Policeman (uncredited)
The Undefeated (1969) – Thad Benedict
The Merry Wives of Tobias Rouke (1972) – Tobias Rouke
Between Friends (1973) – Will
Peopletoys (1974) – Dr. Brown
Why Rock the Boat? (1974) – Philip Butcher
Silver Streak (1976) – Conventioneer
Blood and Guts (1978) – Red Henkel
The Brood (1979) – Barton Kelly
Death Hunt (1981) – Bill Luce
Every Dog's Guide to Complete Home Safety (1986) – The Boss
Family Reunion (1988) – Leo
I Love You to Death (1990) – Wendel Carter
Epicenter (2000) – Pat
Lion of Oz (2000) – Narrator (voice)

References

External links
 
 How to Sell your Film Project at Google Books
 Brian Beckman: On Analog Computing, Some Beckman History, and Life in the Universe at Channel 9
 
 

1921 births
2008 deaths
Canadian male television actors
Canadian male film actors
Canadian male voice actors
Canadian non-fiction writers
Male actors from Halifax, Nova Scotia
Writers from Halifax, Nova Scotia
Best Supporting Actor Genie and Canadian Screen Award winners
20th-century non-fiction writers
Canadian expatriates in the United States
Canadian military personnel of World War II